This is a list of museums in Samoa:

 EFKS Museum
 Falemata'aga - The Museum of Samoa
 Robert Louis Stevenson Museum
 Samoa Cultural Centre
 Tiapapata Art Centre
 The Vanya Taule'alo Gallery

Museums
Samoa
Samoa
Museums